The 2011 Aegon International was a combined men's and women's tennis tournament played on outdoor grass courts. It was the 37th edition of the event for the women and the 3rd edition for the men. It was classified as a WTA Premier tournament on the 2011 WTA Tour and as an ATP World Tour 250 series on the 2011 ATP World Tour. The event took place at the Devonshire Park Lawn Tennis Club in Eastbourne, United Kingdom from June 11 through June 18, 2011. The men's doubles final was originally scheduled to take place on June 17, but due to rain delays it was eventually played on June 19 at Roehampton instead.

ATP entrants

Seeds

 Seedings are based on the rankings as of June 6, 2011.

Other entrants
The following players received wildcards into the main draw:
  Daniel Cox
  Daniel Evans
  Colin Fleming
The following player(s) were promoted into the main draw as special exempts:
  James Ward
The following qualified for the main draw:

  Rainer Schüttler
  Alexander Slabinsky
  Donald Young
  Evgeny Kirillov
The following player(s) were promoted into the main draw as lucky losers:
  Illya Marchenko

WTA entrants

Seeds

 Seedings are based on the rankings as of June 6, 2011.

Other entrants
The following players received wildcards into the main draw:
  Elena Baltacha
  Heather Watson
  Serena Williams

The following qualified for the main draw:

  Zheng Jie
  Bojana Jovanovski
  Mirjana Lučić
  Tamira Paszek

Champions

Men's singles

 Andreas Seppi defeated  Janko Tipsarević, 7–6(7–5), 3–6, 5–3 ret.
It was Seppi's 1st career title.

Women's singles

 Marion Bartoli defeated  Petra Kvitová, 6–1, 4–6, 7–5
It was Bartoli's 1st title of the year and 6th of her career. It was her 2nd career Premier-level title. It was her first grass title.

Men's doubles

 Jonathan Erlich /  Andy Ram defeated  Grigor Dimitrov /  Andreas Seppi, 6–3, 6–3

Women's doubles

 Květa Peschke /  Katarina Srebotnik defeated  Liezel Huber /  Lisa Raymond, 6–3, 6–0

References

External links
 Official website

Aegon International
Aegon International
Eastbourne International
Aegon International
June 2011 sports events in the United Kingdom